The Maze Runner is a 2009 young adult dystopian science fiction novel written by American author James Dashner and the first book released in The Maze Runner series. The novel was published on October 6, 2009, by Delacorte Press, an imprint of Random House, and was made into a 2014 major motion picture by 20th Century Fox, directed by Wes Ball.

Plot     
Thomas wakes up in a metal elevator that brings him to the Glade. He has no memory of who he is or how he got there, except for his name. He gradually discovers that the Glade is run by two boys: Alby, the leader, and Newt, the second-in-charge, who both maintain order by enforcing simple but effective rules. The elevator box surfaces from under the ground once every month and supplies new food, tools, medicine, and sometimes weapons. Every month, a new boy with no memory of anything but his first name also appears in the box.

The Glade is surrounded by a square of four-mile-high walls made of concrete. The walls have openings in them, which slide shut  every night. Outside the walls is the Maze, a labyrinth of high concrete walls covered in ivy that changes every day. The Maze houses strange, lethal creatures known as Grievers. All that is known of them is that they are a combination of metal and flesh. The Gladers try to stay alive as well as "solve" the Maze by appointing "runners" to run through it as fast as they can while they track movements of the walls and try to find an exit to escape.

One day after Thomas' arrival, a girl, Teresa, is delivered through the elevator into the Glade. She was the first girl to arrive into the Glade and has a note stating "She's the last one. Ever." She wakes and says Thomas' name before falling into a week long coma. Later that day a boy named Ben who went through the "changing" tries to kill Thomas. Alby saves Thomas and Ben is banished that night.  

Minho, the Keeper of the Runners, goes into the Maze with Alby to see what they think is their first dead Griever. Alby is stung by the creature, which causes him to attack Minho who knocks Alby out. Minho carries Alby back to the glade but he is too late and the doors are already closing. Thomas runs into the maze to help with no hesitation, becoming stranded with Minho and Alby. When they hear the sounds of grievers approaching, Minho and Thomas use the ivy to pull Alby up the wall. Minho sees a Griever approaching them and runs, leaving Thomas alone. Thomas does his best to survive and keep Alby alive, and by morning Thomas has killed most of the Grievers and found Minho. 

After returning to the Glade the next morning, Newt calls a Gathering of the Keepers to discuss what to do with Thomas. Some of the Keepers vote to relieve him of punishment, but others, especially Gally, vote to lock him up  as a punishment. Minho, however, nominates Thomas to become a runner although Gally does not agree. Newt is in charge while Alby recovers, so he decides to put Thomas in the pit for one night and the next day would be Thomas' first time as a proper runner. Gally still does not agree and storms off in a rage as Frypan, the cook, goes after him.

Teresa wakes from her coma, finds Thomas, and tells him she triggered the ending. The food is running low, the box is not coming up, and that same night the maze doors stay open. All of a sudden Grievers enter the glade leaving the teens to fend for themselves. Several of the Gladers die, including Zart. Newt is suddenly in charge of the surviving teens.

The next morning, Gally attacks Thomas and screams that it is all Thomas' fault. He says that the Griever will kill one Glader a night. On the third night Thomas gets stung by a Griever which caused him to black out and get some of his memories back. Once Thomas wakes up he finds himself with Teresa in the pit and is about to be banished or, in Gally’s words, sacrificed to the Grievers.  Newt and Minho fight Gally and two of his friends and then let Teresa and Thomas go.

After Thomas and the Gladers discover the pattern, the Gladers decide to make a run for the exit. They succeed, only to find out that they were test subjects in an experiment conducted by the organization World In Catastrophe: Killzone Experiment Department (WICKED). The teenagers escape and find a video explaining that three years ago the world was scorched by the sun which killed millions of people and a disease that attacked the brain and killed and changed people. Then out of no where Gally appears but, having been stung, was now infected. Gally has a gun in his hand and he tries to kill Thomas but Chuck, the youngest Glader, jumps in the way of the bullet. Minho then kills Gally with a spear. 

After briefly mourning Chuck's death, all six Gladers are rescued and brought to a warehouse. There, they are informed about catastrophic solar flares that caused an apocalyptic event. The rescuers reveal that the Gladers are among a group of orphaned children being tested to find a cure for the virus.

The epilogue is written in the voice of Chancellor Ava Paige, a feature of all the trilogy's novels. She reveals that the group that rescued the Gladers may just be another variable in the experiment and that the Gladers were not the only group being evaluated. This leads directly into the events of the next book.

Characters
 Thomas The main protagonist of the novel. He is the last boy but not the last person to enter the Glade. The only thing he can remember when he comes into the Glade is his name, a common pattern amongst the Gladers. Chuck describes him as about 16 years old, of average height, and brown-haired. He was called "Greenie", a nickname given to new arrivals. He becomes a Runner with Minho after being the first person to spend a whole night (along with Minho) in the Maze and saves Alby when he is about to die. 
 Teresa One of the main protagonists. The first girl and last person to enter the Glade. When she entered the Glade she was in a coma and Newt thought she was dead. She also calls Thomas "Tom". She is also known to help Thomas out of the maze and fight the Grievers in the Griever Hole. She is thin, has black hair and blue eyes, and relatively pale skin.
 Alby The eldest and the leader of the Gladers. He is described as a 'dark-skinned boy with short-cropped hair, his face clean-shaven'. He tries to keep order within the group by having all the boys follow the rules they've set down to survive. He has a very close relationship with Newt, his second-in-command. He was in the group of 30 people who first arrived in the Glade. Alby commits suicide by walking into a group of Grievers, thinking that it was better that he die there than outside the Maze.
  Newt One of the main protagonists and is good friends with Thomas and Minho. He used to be a Runner but is no longer able-footed since he threw himself off the maze wall. He is very kind, friendly, and welcoming to Thomas. He is Alby's closest friend and second-in-command and takes over as leader when Alby no longer feels capable. Newt was described as being rather tall and muscular, with blond hair that came down over his shoulders and a square jaw. He had a limp from his attempted suicide, during which he climbed one of the walls in the Maze and leaped off it. In the books, Newt is often "the older boy", hinting that he's at least older than Thomas.
 Minho One of the main protagonists and is the Keeper of the Runners. He is in charge of navigating and mapping out the Maze. As a Runner, he is in very good shape and is described as "an Asian kid with strong, heavily-muscled arms and short black hair." He is sarcastic and a jokester. He tends to react without thinking, which leads him into trouble. He and Thomas quickly become good friends. 
 Chuck A young and chubby boy with curly hair who was the newest Glader until Thomas arrived. He immediately becomes friends with Thomas and acts like a little brother towards him. Chuck was a "Slopper", one of the Gladers who handle all the dirty, distasteful jobs the others don't want. He is around 13 years old. He is killed by Gally after a dagger is thrown at Thomas and he saves him
  Gally The main antagonist, Gally is a Glader who lives by the rules Alby put in place. He does not trust Thomas and shows an immense dislike for him. He is also the Keeper of the Builders. He runs away from the Glade in a fit of rage after exclaiming that he thought "Thomas was not to be trusted" in the Gathering. At the end of the book, he kills Chuck when he tries to save Thomas from being hit with a dagger.
 Ben A Runner. After undergoing the Changing and attempting to kill Thomas, he is banished to the Maze while still psychotic and dies overnight.
 Ava Paige The Chancellor of WICKED and the person responsible for sending teenagers into the Maze. She appears in the Epilogue in an e-mail.
  Grievers Biomechanical creatures that haunt and kill the Gladers in the maze. "A large, bulbous creature the size of a cow but with no distinct shape" as the book described them. In "The Ending" they are let free into the Glade to kill one person every day.

Development
In late 2005 mid-June, Dashner had published four books to complete The Jimmy Fincher Saga, which had been with a small regional publisher. His publisher wanted him to write another book, but he decided he would try for a national book market instead. In November of that year he had an idea for a book
“about a bunch of teenagers living inside an unsolvable Maze full of hideous creatures, in the future, in a dark, dystopian world. It would be an experiment, to study their minds. Terrible things would be done to them – awful things; completely hopeless – until the victims turn everything on its head." The book was later published in 2008. Dashner wrote the book from December 2005 to March 2006.

Reception
Kirkus Reviews wrote: "Hard to put down, this is clearly just a first installment, and it will leave readers dying to find out what comes next."

Jessica Harrison of the Deseret Morning News labeled The Maze Runner as "a thrilling adventurous book for kids ages 13+ that will get readers' hearts pumping and leave them asking for more." She noted that it "starts out a bit slow" but as it matched Thomas's confusion and picked up pace as he became more accustomed, she wrote that "it's almost as if Dashner is easing the reader into what becomes a fast-paced, nonstop action." However, she thought the "only drawback" was the "fictionalized slang", saying, "While it feels realistic and fits with his characters, it gets old pretty fast. On the plus side, however, it's used so often that the reader almost becomes desensitized and learns to ignore it."

Film adaptation 

Fox released a film adaptation of the book, titled The Maze Runner, on 19 September 2014. Wes Ball signed on as director and T.S. Nowlin wrote the screenplay. Dylan O'Brien played the lead role of Thomas, Thomas Brodie-Sangster portrayed Newt and Kaya Scodelario portrayed Teresa. Ki Hong Lee as Minho, Blake Cooper, Will Poulter and Aml Ameen were added to the cast as Chuck, Gally and Alby, respectively. Patricia Clarkson played the role of the main antagonist Ava Paige. Dexter Darden portrayed Frypan, Alexander Flores portrayed Winston, Jacob Latimore played Jeff, Randal Cunningham portrayed Clint, Chris Sheffield portrayed Ben, and Joe Adler played Zart.

Wayne Haag served as an artist on the film, and Ellen Goldsmith-Vein, Lindsay Williams with Lee Stollman as producers.

Creature designer Ken Barthelmey designed the Grievers for the film.

Filming started on 13 May 2013, and ended 12 July 2013.

References

External links

 James Dashner (author) site (official)
 

 
2009 American novels
American young adult novels
Dystopian novels
American post-apocalyptic novels
Books by James Dashner
American novels adapted into films
Orphans in fiction
Science fiction novels adapted into films